Bookan, or , is a moribund language of the Murut people of Sabah, Malaysia.

References

Murutic languages
Endangered Austronesian languages
Languages of Malaysia